A transmission control room (TCR), transmission suite, Tx room, or presentation suite is a room at broadcast facilities and television stations around the world. Compared to a master control room, it is usually smaller in size and is a scaled-down version of centralcasting. A TX room or presentation suite will be staffed 24/7 by presentation coordinators and tape operators and will be fitted out with video play-out systems often using server based broadcast automation. 

For operational and content qualitative reasons, not more than two television channels are managed from one TCR. Channels with live content and production switching requirements like sports channels have their own dedicated TCRs. A television station may have several TCRs depending on the number of channels they broadcast.

Presentation suite

The presentation suite is staffed 24/7 by on-air presentation coordinators who are responsible for the continuity and punctual play out of scheduled broadcast programming. Programming may be live from the television studio or played from  video tape or from video server playout. When broadcast programming is 'live' the presentation coordinator will override the broadcast automation system and manually switch television programming. The presentation coordinator will directly coordinate live television programming going to air in consultation with master control and the production assistant (PA) or the director's assistant (DA). The presentation coordinator will arrange program source to be allocated by master control and advise the DA as to the start time and count the production in from 10 seconds to first-frame of picture and the DA will count the production out to the television commercial break and so on it continues to the end of the program. Live programming is unpredictable and will affect the scheduled timing of scheduled programing events; the presentation coordinator adjusts programming to bring the schedule back on time by adding or removing fill content from the playout schedule.

Common TCR equipment 
 Broadcast control desk
 Broadcast automation control computers
 Production switcher
 Talkback (recording)
 Broadcast quality video monitor
 Waveform monitor
 SDI audio de-embedder
 Video play-out automation
 Character generator (CG) titles generator

See also 
 Master control room
 Central apparatus room
 Broadcast engineering

References 

Broadcasting
Broadcast engineering
Rooms
Television terminology